The Lhasa Hotel, formerly known as Holiday Inn Lhasa is a 4-star hotel in the city of Lhasa, Tibet, China; lying at an altitude of 3,600 m.

History 
Completed in September 1985, it is located northeast of the Norbu Lingka Summer Palace in west of Lhasa. The hotel is the flagship of the China International Travel Service' installations in Tibet. It accommodates about 1,000 guests over 450 rooms (suites).

In media 
An account of running the hotel is related in the 2001 book The Hotel on the Roof of the World.

External links
Official site

References 

Hotels in Tibet
Buildings and structures in Lhasa
1985 establishments in China